The Straight and Narrow is a 1918 American silent comedy film featuring Oliver Hardy.

Cast
 Billy West - Ex-convict
 Oliver Hardy - His former cellmate (as Babe Hardy)
 Leo White - Safecracker
 Ethel Marie Burton
 Rosemary Theby
 Myrtle Lind

See also
 List of American films of 1918
 Oliver Hardy filmography

References

External links

1918 films
American silent short films
1918 short films
American black-and-white films
1918 comedy films
Silent American comedy films
American comedy short films
1910s American films